The Peugeot Challenge was a golf tournament on the Challenge Tour that was played in Spain from 2004 to 2006.

Winners

References

External links
Coverage on the Challenge Tour's official site

Former Challenge Tour events
Golf tournaments in Spain